Superintendent's Residence or variations may refer to:

Superintendent's Residence (Cottonwood, Arizona), listed on the NRHP in Arizona
Grand Canyon National Park Superintendent's Residence, listed on the NRHP in Arizona
Acting Superintendent's Headquarters, Wawona, CA, listed on the NRHP in California
Superintendent's Residence, Great Sand Dunes National Monument, Mosca, CO, listed on the NRHP in Colorado
Colorado State Hospital Superintendent's House, Pueblo, CO, listed on the NRHP in Colorado
Superintendent's House (Mammoth Cave, Kentucky), listed on the NRHP in Kentucky
U.S. Army Corps of Engineers Superintendent's House and Workmen's Office, Woodbury, KY, listed on the NRHP in Kentucky
Borden Mines Superintendent's House, Frostburg, MD, listed on the NRHP in Maryland
Wyeth Brickyard Superintendent's House, Cambridge, MA, listed on the NRHP in Massachusetts
Superintendent's Cottage (Flint, Michigan), listed on the NRHP in Michigan 
Hanna, M.A., Company Michigan District Superintendent's House, Stambaugh, MI, listed on the NRHP in Michigan
General Superintendent's House, Coleraine, MN, listed on the NRHP in Minnesota
Itasca Lumber Company Superintendent's House, Deer River, MN, listed on the NRHP in Minnesota
National Woodenware Company Superintendent's Residence, Hill City, MN, listed on the NRHP in Minnesota
Pipestone Indian School Superintendent's House, Pipestone, MN, listed on the NRHP in Minnesota
Superintendent's Home at Columbia Training School, Columbia, MS, listed on the NRHP in Mississippi
Old Superintendent's House, Tupelo Fish Hatchery, Tupelo, MS, listed on the NRHP in Mississippi
Superintendent's House (Philipsburg, Montana), listed on the NRHP in Montana 
Superintendent's House, Atlantic & Pacific Railroad, Albuquerque, NM, listed on the NRHP in New Mexico
Superintendent's Residence (Santa Fe, New Mexico), listed on the NRHP in New Mexico 
Dutchess Company Superintendent's House, Wappingers Falls, NY, listed on the NRHP in New York
Lebanon Cemetery Superintendent's House, Lebanon, OH, listed on the NRHP in Ohio
Oakland Cemetery Chapel and Superintendent's House and Office, Sandusky, OH, listed on the NRHP in Ohio
Crater Lake Superintendent's Residence, Crater Lake National Park, OR, listed on the NRHP in Oregon
Superintendent's House (Sumpter, Oregon), listed on the NRHP in Oregon 
Superintendent of Lighthouses' Dwelling, San Juan, PR, listed on the NRHP in Puerto Rico
Utah Copper Company Mine Superintendent's House, Copperton, UT, listed on the NRHP in Utah
Superintendent's Residence at the Utah State Hospital, Provo, UT, listed on the NRHP in Utah
Union Mills Superintendent's House, Olympia, WA, listed on the NRHP in Washington
Salsich Lumber Company Superintendent's House, Yelm, WA, listed on the NRHP in Washington
Cooper's Rock State Forest Superintendent's House and Garage, Morgantown, WV, listed on the NRHP in West Virginia